A Weaver on the Horizon (Chinese: 天涯织女) is a 2010 Chinese television series based on the life story of Huang Daopo, who revolutionized the textile industry during the Mongol conquest of the Song dynasty and the beginning of the Yuan dynasty. The story is considered to be historical fiction, as the plot deviates from factual accounts. A notable feature of the series is that more focus is placed on the female protagonists than their male counterparts. The series premiered on Nanning Television on 14 August 2010 and ran for 36 episodes.

Synopsis
Huang Qiao'er (Ivy Lu, Janine Chang) was born to a poverty-stricken family. She lost her parents at an early age and was raised by her aunt, who taught her textile arts. While growing up in a textile mill, Huang developed a close bond with the neighboring dyehouse owner's son, Fang Ning (Edwin Siu), who fell in love with her. Eventually, Splendid Mill's weavers produce outstanding results and earn an opportunity to work in the imperial palace. Through Huang's friendship with the emperor's niece, Zhao Jiayi (Cecilia Liu), Huang is able to gain access to the palace's study, deepening her knowledge of weaving from its collection. However, the weavers become embroiled in a power struggle with the emperor's concubines, as well as a rivalry with the Iridescent Cloud Mill's weavers, who also work at the palace. 
 
While in the palace, Huang falls in love with a young general, Lin Mufei (Justin Yuan), at the expense of her friendship with the princess. Lin also rejects the princess' affections, due to his despise  against imperial family members' corruption, and in spite of his vows to defend the Song dynasty. During Lin's absence, Fang Ning's legs are crippled while saving Huang from the corrupt members of the imperial court. Feeling guilty for Fang's plight, and hearing rumors that Lin had been killed in battle at the city of Chuzhou (present day Huai'an), Huang decides to marry Fang. Lin, however, has survived and is heartbroken when he sees the two marry, thus complicating the love triangle between Lin, Huang, and Zhao Jiayi. 
 
Despite Huang Qiao'er's awareness that she cannot be with the man she still loves, due to her marriage to another, she recognizes that being Fang Ning's wife also has its benefits. Her mother-in-law (Cheng Pei-pei) imparts the family's dyeing secrets, which helps her hone her textile skills. However, Fang is aware that his wife still has feelings towards Lin Mufei. This prompts Fang to become an alcoholic, leading him to repeatedly abuse her under intoxication and jealousy. As for Zhao Jiayi, she remains devoted to Lin, and, after learning that he did not die, eventually sneaks away from the palace to search for him. With the help of Lin's mother, Zhao locates him in the city of Changzhou. She claims that she only wishes to be with Lin Mufei in battle, regardless of whether he would ultimately love her or not. 
 
Not long afterwards, the Mongols, who establish the Yuan dynasty under the leadership of Kublai Khan, conquer the Song dynasty.  After going through a series of personal misfortunes and tragedies, Lin is traumatized and decides to focus on protecting Zhao Jiayi, and her surviving clan members, as well as liberating China from the Mongols' tyranny. For three years, while battling their enemies and taking care of one another, Lin and Zhao begin to develop a close bond and mutual understanding. Zhao helps Lin nurse his despairs, resulting from Huang's marriage to Fang Ning and his mother's execution by one of their adversaries. He starts to reciprocate the princess's affection, when he realizes that there is more to her than her apparent vain behavior.

While fleeing from the Mongols' conquest, Huang has a chance encounter with an extraordinary woodwork instructor, Feng Jiujin (Damian Lau), and becomes his apprentice. She ultimately wanders to Yazhou (present day Hainan), where she learns the arts of cotton farming and weaving, and helps the natives improve their textile technology. 
 
Years after Fang Ning's death, Huang finally resolves the entanglement with Lin and Zhao, by reuniting with them in the city of Hangzhou (former Song capital Lin'an). Huang sadly realizes that she has inadvertently brought two men who loved her nothing but heartbreak, instead of happiness. Regretting her mistakes, she gives her blessing to Lin and Zhao of their newfound love for each other, and accepts her fate as a widow. Huang also realizes her goal of revolutionizing the art of textile manufacturing, for the welfare of her people. With support from her family and friends, Huang becomes an innovator of the Chinese textile industry. After numerous battles against the Yuan forces with Song remnants, the Battle of Yamen officially ends to the Song dynasty. Lin and Zhao, after enduring these defeats, realize that the enemy is too powerful and not yet ready for the resistance to overthrow. Yearning for to escape from the violence and tragedies in their lives, they choose to elope and go into seclusion together.
 
Lin Mufei and Zhao Jiayi are happily married and return to Hangzhou after spending three years in hiding. By this time, the Splendid Mill and Fang Family Dyehouse have brought in many apprentices and achieved business success, with Huang Qiao'er fulfilling her purpose in life.

Cast

Splendid Mill

Song imperial family (House of Zhao)

Song imperial court

Fang Family Dyehouse

Yazhou

Others

Production
The Song and Mongol military costumes are originally made for the two television series The Young Warriors (2006) and The Legend of the Condor Heroes (2008).

Originally considered for the part of Huang Qiao'er by the casting department, Cecilia Liu expressed her interest to portray Zhao Jiayi instead, after reading the script. As a result, Janine Chang was chosen for the starring role.

Deviations from historic accounts 
In Chinese history, Emperor Lizong and Emperor Duzong of the Song dynasty were actually uncle and nephew. In A Weaver on the Horizon, they are changed to brothers to explain Zhao Jiayi's existence. In reality, Zhao Jiayi never existed and is a fictional character solely created for A Weaver on the Horizon. The screenwriters were unwilling to write Zhao as the daughter of Duzong due to his well-known corrupted reputations that contributed of fall of the Song dynasty.

Almost all of the characters in the series are fictional except Huang Daopo, Emperor Duzong, Mongol general Bayan, and Yelü Chucai. Most of the plot does not match actual historic accounts. There are references to the death of Emperor Duzong, the succession and abdication of Emperor Gongzong, Battle of Xiangyang, Battle of Yamen and the deaths of the Song's last two emperors; Emperor Duanzong and Emperor Huaizong.

Deleted scenes
Several websites aired different scenes that were deleted from the series:
Huang Qiao'er first meets the Fang brothers during their childhood.
Death of A'dong's fiancée Dandan (portrayed by Janine Chang).
Huang Qiao'er and Rong Xiuman being burned at the stake on Yazhou.
Lin Mufei and Zhao Jiayi returning home as husband and wife in the series finale.

Reception
The series was well received in mainland China, earning high ratings and acclaim for good performance and a portrayal of inspirational female characters.

International broadcast

References

External links
  A Weaver on the Horizon official page on Chinese Entertainment Shanghai's website
  A Weaver on the Horizon on Sina.com
  A Weaver on the Horizon page on CTV's website

2010 Chinese television series debuts
2010 Chinese television series endings
Fiction set in the 1270s
Alcohol abuse in television
Asian wars in television
Chinese historical television series
Domestic violence in television
Cultural depictions of Chinese women
Cultural depictions of inventors
Huang Daopo
Television series about art
Television series about orphans
Television shows about rebels
Television series by Tangren Media
Television series set in the Southern Song
Television series set in the Yuan dynasty
Television shows set in Hangzhou
Television shows set in Shanghai
Television shows set in Hainan
Television shows set in Guangdong
Works about atonement
Television series set in the 13th century
Racism in television
Poverty in television